(UTEF) is a national university in Munakata, Fukuoka, Japan. The predecessor of the school was founded in 1876, and it was chartered as a university in 1949. The present name was adopted in 1966.

Associated primary schools
 Fukuoka University of Education Kindergarten
 Fukuoka University of Education Fukuoka Elementary School
 Fukuoka University of Education Fukuoka Junior High School
 Fukuoka University of Education Kurume Elementary School
 Fukuoka University of Education Kurume Junior High School
 Fukuoka University of Education Kokura Elementary School
 Fukuoka University of Education Kokura Junior High School

Athletics

American Football 

UTEF has an American football team that competes in the Kyūshū Collegiate American Football Association

External links

 Official website

Educational institutions established in 1876
Japanese national universities
Universities and colleges in Fukuoka Prefecture
1876 establishments in Japan
Teachers colleges in Japan